Bartosz Tarachulski (born 14 May 1975 in Gliwice) is a Polish football manager and former professional footballer. He currently manages II liga side KKS 1925 Kalisz.

Career
Tarachulski has enjoyed spells in Poland, Israel and Belgium. From K.S.K. Beveren (2300) in Belgium he signed for Yeovil Town in England helping them to gain promotion scoring 10 league goals. He quickly became a firm favourite amongst the fans and was known for a brilliant first touch. He left the Glovers after they won promotion to League One to sign for Dunfermline Athletic in the Scottish Premier League. At Dunfermline he played in the 2006 Scottish League Cup Final against Celtic. He was released after just one season and signed for Greek side Veria FC. In 2007, he signed for Kavala FC.

References

External links
 
 
 

1975 births
Living people
Polish footballers
Polish expatriate footballers
Scottish Premier League players
English Football League players
Belgian Pro League players
K.S.K. Beveren players
Yeovil Town F.C. players
Dunfermline Athletic F.C. players
Veria F.C. players
Kavala F.C. players
Diagoras F.C. players
AEL Kalloni F.C. players
Polonia Warsaw players
Expatriate footballers in Greece
Hapoel Be'er Sheva F.C. players
Polish expatriate sportspeople in Greece
Expatriate footballers in Israel
Polish expatriate sportspeople in Israel
Expatriate footballers in Scotland
Polish expatriate sportspeople in Scotland
Expatriate footballers in Belgium
Polish expatriate sportspeople in Belgium
Expatriate footballers in England
Polish expatriate sportspeople in England
Sportspeople from Gliwice
Association football forwards
MKP Pogoń Siedlce players
Polish football managers
MKP Pogoń Siedlce managers
Legionovia Legionowo managers
II liga managers